Positif was a 1984 studio album by Jean-Jacques Goldman, his third solo album recorded in French. It was recorded at Studio Gang by Olivier do Espirito Santo and Jean-Pierre Janiaud. It was released by JRG/BMG Music Publishing. It was certified diamond in France for sales of 1,000,000 copies.

Track listing

Personnel
Guy Delacrois - bass
Manu Katché, Marc Changereau - percussion
Catherine Bonnevay, Jean-Jacques Goldman, Jean-Pierre Janiaud, Dominique Poulain - vocals
Jean-Jacques Goldman - keyboards
Claude Engel, Jean-Jacques Goldman, Alain Pewzner, Kamil Rustam, Patrice Tison - guitar
Roland Romanelli - organ
Jean-Yves d'Angelo - piano
John Helliwell - saxophone
Roland Romanelli - synthesizer
Patrice Mondon - violin

References

1984 albums
Jean-Jacques Goldman albums